The yellow sand cichlid (Xenotilapia flavipinnis) is a species of cichlid endemic to Lake Tanganyika where it is found in schools in areas with sandy substrates. This species can reach a length of  TL. It can also be found in the aquarium trade.

References

External links
 Photograph at FishBase

flavipiinis
Fish described in 1985
Taxonomy articles created by Polbot